Hargrave may refer to:

People 

 Hargrave (surname)

Places

Hargrave, Manitoba, Canada
Hargrave, Cheshire, England
Hargrave, Northamptonshire, England
Hargrave, Suffolk, England
Hargrave, Kansas, United States

Other uses

11777 Hargrave, a Main-belt asteroid
Hargrave Military Academy, Chatham, Virginia, United States
Hargrave River (disambiguation), several rivers

See also 
 Hargraves
 Hargreave (surname)
 Hargreaves (surname)